The 1996 CA-TennisTrophy was a men's tennis tournament played on indoor carpet courts at the Wiener Stadthalle in Vienna in Austria and was part of the Championship Series of the 1996 ATP Tour. It was the 22nd edition of the tournament and took place from 7 October through 13 October 1996. Fifth-seeded Boris Becker won the singles title.

Finals

Singles

 Boris Becker defeated  Jan Siemerink 6–4, 6–7(7–9), 6–2, 6–3
 It was Becker's 3rd title of the year and the 62nd of his career.

Doubles

 Yevgeny Kafelnikov /  Daniel Vacek defeated  Menno Oosting /  Pavel Vízner 7–6, 6–4
 It was Kafelnikov's 9th title of the year and the 24th of his career. It was Vacek's 4th title of the year and the 14th of his career.

References

External links
 Official website 
 ATP tournament profile
 ITF tournament edition details

CA-TennisTrophy
Vienna Open